Drishya is a 2014 Indian Kannada-language crime thriller film directed by P. Vasu and produced by E4 Entertainment, starring V. Ravichandran and Navya Nair. It is a remake of the 2013 Malayalam-language film Drishyam, directed by Jeethu Joseph and starring Mohanlal and Meena. The supporting cast feature an ensemble of Achyuth Kumar, Prabhu, Asha Sarath, Swaroopini Narayan, Unnathi and Rohith B. The film's music was composed by Ilaiyaraaja. A sequel Drishya 2 was released in 2021.

The film released on 20 June 2014 to widespread critical acclaim, with the performances of Ravichandran, Navya Nair and Asha Sarath, and the screenplay receiving special praise. It also saw commercial success and completed 100-day runs in theatres.

Plot
Rajendra Ponnappa is an orphan who had dropped out of school after his fourth standard. He is now is a businessman running a cable television service in a rural area. He is married to Seetha and they have two daughters, Sindhu, a Plus Two student, and Shreya, a student of class sixth. His only interest apart from his family is watching films. He spends most of his time in front of the TV in his small office.

During a nature camp, Sindhu gets photographed in the bathroom by a hidden cell phone. The culprit, Tarun, is the son of Inspector General of Police Roopa Chandrashekar. Tarun is accidentally killed by Seetha and her daughter when he comes to blackmail them using the clip either any one of them should sleep with him or he will surely publish the clip through Internet. They hide his body in a compost pit, which is witnessed by Shreya. Seetha tells Rajendra about the incident and he devises a way to save his family from the law. He removes the broken cell phone and disposes of Tarun's car, which is seen by a police constable, Suryaprakash, who has a grudge against Rajendra. Rajendra takes his family on a trip to attend a religious meeting, watch a movie and eat at a restaurant. Roopa, realising that her son has gone missing starts an investigation.

After a preliminary investigation, Roopa calls Rajendra and family for questioning. Rajendra had predicted that this would happen and taught his family how to change their alibi at the time of murder. When questioned individually, they reply the same thing and they had also shown the bill of the restaurant, the movie tickets and the bus journeys' tickets as proof of their alibi. Roopa questions the owners of the establishments they have been to and their statements prove Rajendra's alibi. Roopa realises that on the day of the incident, Rajendra had taken the tickets and the bill, made acquaintance with the owners and had gone for the trip with his family the next day, thus proving his alibi and making the owners unwittingly tell the lie.

Roopa arrests Rajendra and family and Suryaprakash uses brute force to beat the truth out of them. Eventually, Shreya gives in and reveals the place where the body is buried. After digging the compost pit, they find the carcass of a calf, indicating that Rajendra had moved the body. Shreya reports to the media and complains against Suryaprakash. The constable is suspended and Roopa resigns from her post. Roopa and her husband meet Rajendra to ask forgiveness for their rude and violent behavior. Rajendra suspects there might be foul play involved and still does not reveal directly that his family has committed a crime. Rajendra, now in remand, signs a register at the newly constructed local police station. As he leaves, a flashback shows him leaving the incomplete police station with a shovel in hand, indicating that he has hidden Tarun's body in the foundations of the very police station that dealt with the said investigation.

Cast

 Ravichandran as Rajendra Ponnappa
 Navya Nair as Seetha
 Aarohi Narayan as Sindhu
 Unnathi as Shreya
 Achyuth Kumar as Surya Prakash
 Asha Sarath as IGP Roopa Chandrashekhar
 Prabhu as Chandrashekhar
 Suchendra Prasad as Inspector 
 Srinivasa Murthy as Seetha's father
 Jai Jagadish
 Dayal Padmanabhan as govt  Contractor
 Rohith Bhanuprakash as Tarun
 Shivaram as Hotel owner
 Jaya Muruli
 Suresh Mangalore
 Bangalore Nagesh
 Prashanth Siddi as Rajendra Ponnappa's assistant 
 Madan
 Sujay Karanth
 Victory Vasu
 Krishnamurthy Kavatthar
 Auto Nagaraj
 Anjanappa
 Vibhinna Srinivas
 Umesh Sirigere
 Imran
 Mahesh
 Sadhu Kokila in a cameo appearance

Production
After the commercial and critical success of Drishyam, director P. Vasu decided to re-make the film in Tamil language or Telugu language, when he received an offer from the Kannada film production company E4 Entertainment. His name was referred to the producers by actor Ravichandran. It was revealed in February 2014 that the latter would portray Mohanlal's character from the original film. Navya Nair was cast to play the female lead opposite Ravichandran, the role played by Meena in the original film. Swaroopini Narayan was cast to play the role of Ravichandran's elder daughter in the film, following her successful audition for the role after having been spotted on the internet messaging service WhatsApp by one of the crew members.

Filming began on 11 March 2014, in the Kodagu district of Karnataka, a major part of which was shot in Madikeri. Small parts of the film were then shot in Bangalore and Nanjangud. As compared to the Malayalam film, Drishya was trimmed by about 15 to 20 minutes. Reports of the film being titled Drishya came out only in mid-May 2014, a month prior to the film's release.

Soundtrack

Ilaiyaraaja composed the music for the soundtracks that had lyrics written by V. Nagendra Prasad. The album consists of two soundtracks.

Sequel
In 2021, P. Vasu directed a sequel to Drishya named Drishya 2 released on 10 December 2021 which stars Ravichandran, Navya Nair, and Swaroopini in the lead roles alongside Prabhu, and Asha Sharath in the supporting roles.

Release and reception 
Upon theatrical release on 20 June 2014, the film received positive reviews from critics. Performances of Ravichandran, Navya Nair and Asha Sarath received overwhelmingly positive reviews, along with the film's screenplay.

Shashiprasad of Deccan Chronicle rated the film 4 in a scale of 5 and said, "With the perfect screenplay, Dhrishya thrills and grips the audience right till the end with crazy star V.Ravichandran at his best performance lately, which syncs so well that the character of Rajendra Ponnappa seems tailor-made for him." The reviewer of Sify.com said, "A commendable team effort and the movie is definitely worth a watch!" Shyam Prasad S. of Bangalore Mirror rated the film 3.5/5 and called it a "masterly remake" of the Malayalam version, and added that the film was Ravichandran's best in many years. He concluded writing praises of the performances of all the lead actors. G. S. Kumar of The Times of India too gave a 3.5/5 rating and wrote, "Director P Vasu knows that secret and has brilliantly incorporated it in the screenplay." He added praising the performances of the lead actors and music, and giving "a special mention" to cinematographer Madhu Neelakantan's work. Writing for The New Indian Express, A. Sharadhaa reviewed the film and called it "neat little thriller and a family drama". She commended the performances of the actors, direction, screenplay and music, and the roles of the film's cinematographer and the editor.

Baradwaj Rangan of Filmcompanion performed a comparative analysis of five versions of the movie and praised Ravichandran's performance in the climax for taking "stoicism to zen levels".

Accolades
62nd Filmfare Awards South
 Nominated, Best Film – Kannada
 Best Supporting Actor – Kannada — Achyuth Kumar
 Nominated, Best Supporting Actress – Kannada — Asha Sarath

4th South Indian International Movie Awards
 Nominated, Best Film – Kannada
 Nominated, Best Director – Kannada — P. Vasu
 Nominated, Best Actress in a Supporting Role (Female) – Kannada — Swaroopini Narayan

References

External links 

2010s Kannada-language films
2014 drama films
2014 films
2014 thriller drama films
Films directed by P. Vasu
Films scored by Ilaiyaraaja
Films shot in Karnataka
Indian thriller drama films
Kannada remakes of Malayalam films
Shot-for-shot remakes